The 1877 Stevens football team was an American football team that represented Stevens Institute of Technology in the 1877 college football season. The team compiled a 1–3 record.

Schedule

References

Stevens
Stevens Tech Ducks football seasons
Stevens football